Mount Oklahoma is a high mountain summit in the Sawatch Range of the Rocky Mountains of North America. The mountain was named in honor of the University of Oklahoma.

Mountain

Historical names
Mount Oklahoma – 1967 
Oklahoma Mount

See also

List of Colorado mountain ranges
List of Colorado mountain summits
List of Colorado fourteeners
List of Colorado 4000 meter prominent summits
List of the most prominent summits of Colorado
List of Colorado county high points

References

External links

Oklahoma
Mountains of Pitkin County, Colorado
San Isabel National Forest
White River National Forest
Great Divide of North America
North American 4000 m summits